Roberto Guitto (born 5 February 1991) is an Italian footballer who plays as a midfielder for Italian club Lornano Badesse.

Club career
On 13 January 2021, Giutto joined Serie D side Lornano Badesse.

References

External links
 
 
 

1991 births
Living people
Footballers from Naples
Italian footballers
Association football midfielders
Ravenna F.C. players
Empoli F.C. players
A.S.D. Città di Varese players
Serie B players
Serie C players
Serie D players